Lac des Bouillouses or Llac de la Bollosa is a lake in Pyrénées-Orientales, France. At an elevation of 2017 m, its surface area is 1.49 km².

Bouillouses